Canary Creek is a  long first-order tributary to the Broadkill River in Sussex County, Delaware.

Course
Canary Creek rises on the Wolfe Glade divide in Lewes, Delaware and then flows generally northwest to join the Broadkill River about 1-mile northwest of Lewes, Delaware.

Variant names
According to the Geographic Names Information System, it has also been known historically as:
Canarical Creek
Canarikill
Pagan Creek

Watershed
Canary Creek drains  of area, receives about 45.4 in/year of precipitation, and is about 3.19% forested.

See also
List of rivers of Delaware

References

Rivers of Delaware
Rivers of Sussex County, Delaware